John David Wathan (born October 4, 1949) is an American former professional baseball player, coach and manager. He played his entire career in Major League Baseball as a catcher for the Kansas City Royals from 1976 to 1985. Wathan was a member of the world champion 1985 Kansas City Royals team. After his playing career, he worked as a coach before serving as the Royals manager from 1987 to 1991. He also managed the California Angels in 1992. Wathan is notable for setting the single-season stolen base record for catchers in 1982 when, he stole 36 bases to break the previous record set by Ray Schalk in 1916.

Baseball career
Wathan, nicknamed "The Duke" for his dead-on impersonations of John Wayne, was drafted in the first round, fourth overall in the 1971 MLB Draft from the University of San Diego, where he played college baseball for the Toreros in 1968–70.

After he retired, Wathan coached for the Royals in 1986 before becoming the manager of Kansas City's AAA Omaha Royals farm club. He was promoted to manager for the big-league Royals on August 28, . He was fired early in the  season after a 15–22 start.

In , Wathan began the season as the third-base coach of the California Angels, but he was named acting manager midway through the campaign when Buck Rodgers was badly hurt in a bus accident and took a medical leave of absence. Wathan led the Angels to a 39–50 record until Rodgers was well enough to return. In -07, Wathan was a roving baserunning and bunting instructor in Kansas City's farm system, and in 2008 he served the Royals as a special assistant to the director of player development.

Two of John's sons, Derek and Dusty, played professional baseball. Derek played minor league baseball from 1998 to 2008, while Dusty played briefly for the Royals in 2002 and is the current third-base coach of the Philadelphia Phillies.

See also

List of Major League Baseball players who spent their entire career with one franchise

References

External links

 John Wathan at SABR (Baseball BioProject)
 The 100 Greatest Royals of All-Time- #41 John Wathan

1949 births
Living people
Baseball players from Iowa
Boston Red Sox coaches
California Angels coaches
California Angels managers
Jacksonville Suns players
Kansas City Royals announcers
Kansas City Royals coaches
Kansas City Royals managers
Kansas City Royals players
Kansas City Royals scouts
Major League Baseball catchers
Major League Baseball bench coaches
Major League Baseball bullpen coaches
Major League Baseball third base coaches
Minor league baseball managers
San Diego Toreros baseball players
Sportspeople from Cedar Rapids, Iowa
Tiburones de La Guaira players
American expatriate baseball players in Venezuela
University of San Diego alumni